Tour or Tours may refer to:

Travel
 Tourism, travel for pleasure
 Tour of duty, a period of time spent in military service
 Campus tour, a journey through a college or university's campus
 Guided tour, a journey through a location, directed by a guide
 Walking tour, a visit of a historical or cultural site undertaken on foot

Entertainment
 Concert tour, a series of concerts by an artist or group of artists in different locations
 Touring theatre, independent theatre that travels to different venues

Sports
 Professional golf tours, otherwise unconnected professional golf tournaments
 Tennis tour, tennis played in tournament format at a series of venues
 Events in various sports named the Pro Tour (disambiguation)
 Tour de France, the world's biggest bicycle race

Places
 Tour-de-Faure, Lot, France
 Tour-en-Bessin, Calvados, France
 Tour-en-Sologne, Loir-et-Cher, France
 Tours, Indre-et-Loire, France
 Tours-en-Savoie, Savoie, France
 Tours-en-Vimeu, Somme, France
 Tours-sur-Marne, Marne, France
 Tours-sur-Meymont, Puy-de-Dôme, France
 Tours, Texas, United States

People
 James Tour (born 1959), nanoscientist
 La Tour (surname)

Other uses
 Tours FC, a French association football club based in Tours

See also

 Grand Tour (disambiguation)
 La Tour (disambiguation)
 Latour (disambiguation)
 Pro Tour (disambiguation)
 The Tour (disambiguation)
 Touré, West African surname
 Touring (disambiguation)
 Tourn, made by medieval sheriffs in England